Oregon Wild, formerly the Oregon Natural Resources Council, is an American conservation organization based in Portland, Oregon, with offices in Eugene and Bend. The group is notable for having had a case, Marsh v. Oregon Natural Resources Council 490 U.S. 360 (1989), tried before the U.S. Supreme Court.

Organization 

To this end, they claim the ability to muster 3,000 members and over 11,000 "e-mail activists." Additionally, Oregon Wild is listed as a plaintiff in cases against the U.S. Bureau of Land Management, the U.S. Forest Service, the U.S. Fish and Wildlife Service, the U.S. Department of the Interior and the State of Oregon.

Name change 
In 2006, the ONRC changed its name to Oregon Wild, citing concerns that the organization was frequently mistaken for either a government agency or a state chapter of the Natural Resources Defense Council. The new name was hoped to be shorter, less confusing, and easier to remember.

Areas of focus 
Oregon Wild's focus is to protect and restore Oregon’s wildlands, wildlife and waters as an enduring legacy for all Oregonians.

Wilderness 
With about 4 percent of Oregon designated as wilderness, Oregon Wild proposes adding  of forested public lands to the wilderness system, to add to past campaign successes.

Rivers and Clean Water 
Oregon Wild seeks to protect Oregon's rivers, lakes and wetlands from dams, development, mining and logging.  Oregon Wild has ongoing campaigns to protect Portland drinking water quality and the Klamath Basin.

See also 
 Mount Ashland Ski Area

Further reading

References

External links
Oregon Wild (official website)

1974 establishments in Oregon
Environmental organizations based in Oregon